The 2014 Central American Junior and Youth Championships in Athletics took place between May 23–25, 2014. The event was held at the Estadio de Atletismo del Instituto Nicaragüense de Deportes in Managua, Nicaragua.  Organized by the Central American Isthmus Athletic Confederation (CADICA), it was the 27th edition of the Junior (U-20) and the 22nd edition of the Youth (U-18) competition. A total of 86 events were contested, 22 by junior boys, 22 by junior girls, 21 by youth boys, and 21 by youth girls. A total of 17 new championship records were set. Overall winner on points was Guatemala.

Medal summary
Complete results can be found on the CADICA webpage.

Boys (U-20)

Girls (U-20)

*: No points for the team trophy

Boys (U-18)

Girls (U-18)

*: No points for the team trophy

Medal table (unofficial)

Team trophies
The placing table for team trophy awarded to the 1st place overall team (boys and girls categories) was published.

Overall

Boys

Junior (U-20)

Youth (U-18)

Girls

Junior (U-20)

Youth (U-18)

Participation
A total number of 332 athletes (191 boys and 141 girls) were reported to participate in the event.

 (20)
 (89)
 (56)
 (74)
 (10)
 (61)
 Panamá (22)

References

2014
Central American Junior and Youth Championships in Athletics
Sport in Managua
International athletics competitions hosted by Nicaragua
Central American Junior and Youth Championships in Athletics
Central American Junior and Youth Championships in Athletics
2014 in youth sport